Natasha St-Pier is the sixth studio album recorded by Canadian singer Natasha St-Pier. The album was released in November 2008. Two singles were released from the album: "Embrasse-Moi"  and "1, 2, 3".

Background
Natasha St Pier followed St Pier's  2006 album Longueur d’ondes. More personal than previous albums, it alluded to St Pier's family history, referred to her Acadian ancestry on songs such as "L’Instinct De Survie.", and contained typical, but less mournful,  love songs. "Embrasse-Moi" was the first single release taken from the album.

Produced by Pascal Obispo, it was a collaboration between St Pier and Elodie Hesme. Obispo introduced a mixture of electro and acoustic styles, Olivier Reine oversaw instrumental parts, while the musical programming was directed by X-Cell.

Track listing 

 "Embrasse-moi" - 3:10
 "L'esprit de famille" - 4:29
 "1, 2, 3" — 4:01
 "L'Orient Express" - 2:55
 "John" - 3:22
 "Pardonnez-moi" - 3:09
 "L'Instinct de survie" - 3:16
 "Où que j'aille" - 3:29
 "J'Irai te chercher" - 3:08
 "Les Murmures de la fin" - 3:55
 "On veut plus que de l'amour" - 4:09

Singles
Embrasse-Moi
 1, 2, 3.

2008 albums
Natasha St-Pier albums
Sony Music France albums